Halhal Subregion is a subregion in the northwestern Anseba region (Zoba Anseba) of Eritrea. Situated 12 km north of Keren (Cheren), its capital lies at Halhal.

Towns and villages
Bashari
Bet Homeir 
Gam
Karotsahar
Kemeil
Kerbobared
Kosh
Makalaci Awatil
Mashalit
Soter
Wazintat
Zamado
Metkelabe

References

Subregions of Eritrea

Anseba Region
Subregions of Eritrea